Saipem Nigeria is the Nigerian subsidiary company of Saipem,  with a huge structure covering all sort of services to the Oil & Gas Industry such as Drilling On/Offshore, construction activities on/offshore (pipelines, power plants, fabrication activities) Engineering, Maintenance.

EPIC/EPC Contractor with head offices in Lagos and New operational Base in Port Harcourt (Rumulumeni area).

Saipem is under trial in Italy over charges relating to bribery in Nigeria.

References

External links 

 Saipem S.p.a. official site, 'Nigeria'
 Saipem S.p.a. official site
 Saipem re-assures host communities on dev at The Tide online
 Saipem Wins Gbaran Work in Nigeria at rigzone.com
 Saipem Nigeria at Alacrastore

Companies based in Port Harcourt
Oil and gas companies of Nigeria
Nigerian subsidiaries of foreign companies
Eni